|}

The Craven Stakes is a Group 3 flat horse race in Great Britain open to three-year-old colts and geldings. It is run over a distance of 1 mile (1,609 metres) on the Rowley Mile at Newmarket in mid-April.

History
The event is named after William Craven, 6th Baron Craven, a member of the Jockey Club in the 18th century. His support for racing at Newmarket led to the introduction of the Craven Meeting in 1771.

The first race had a subscription of 5 guineas, to which 21 subscribed.  It was to be run "from the ditch to the turn of the lands."
  The race was won by Pantaloon, owned by a Mr Vernon.  Fourteen horses had taken part.

An open-age version of the Craven Stakes was staged annually until the 1870s. It traditionally took place on a Monday in April, and was usually Newmarket's first race of the season. Several other venues had a race of the same name.

The present race, a one-mile event for three-year-olds, was established in 1878. The inaugural running was won by Thurio.

The modern version of the Craven Stakes can serve as a trial for the 2,000 Guineas. The first horse to win both races was Scot Free in 1884. The most recent was Haafhd in 2004.

The Craven Stakes is currently held on the second day of Newmarket's three-day Craven Meeting.

Records

Most successful horse (3 wins):
 Woodpecker – 1778, 1779, 1781

Leading jockey since 1878 (6 wins):
 Morny Cannon – Harbinger (1893), Sempronius (1894), Guernsey (1897), Solennis (1899), Port Blair (1902), His Eminence (1906)

Leading trainer since 1878 (8 wins):
 Sir Michael Stoute – Shadeed (1985), Ajdal (1987), Doyoun (1988), Shaadi (1989), Alnasr Alwasheek (1992), Desert Story (1997), King of Happiness (2002), Adagio (2007)

Winners since 1970

Earlier winners

Original version

 1771: Pantaloon
 1772: Jason
 1773: Firetail
 1774: Sweetwilliam
 1775: Barbary
 1776: Hephestion
 1777: Maiden
 1778: Woodpecker
 1779: Woodpecker
 1780: Triumph
 1781: Woodpecker
 1782: Potoooooooo
 1783: Alaric
 1784: Buzaglo
 1785: Dungannon
 1786: Premier
 1787: Ulysses
 1788: Mufti
 1789: Thorn
 1790: Bullfinch
 1791: Mufti
 1792: Minos
 1793: Buzzard
 1794: Buzzard
 1795: Kitt Carr
 1796: Play or Pay
 1797: Hambletonian
 1798: Aimator
 1799: Spoliator
 1800: Oscar
 1801: Eagle
 1802: Cockfighter
 1803: Eagle
 1804: Aniseed
 1805: Ditto
 1806: Sir David
 1807: Selim
 1808: Deceiver
 1809: Violante
 1810: Rubens
 1811: Recorder
 1812: Flash
 1813: Offas's Dyke
 1814: Slender Billy
 1815: Wire
 1816: Bourbon
 1817: Roller
 1818: Skim
 1819: Cannon Ball
 1820: Antar
 1821: colt by Comus
 1822: Godolphin
 1823: Scarborough
 1824: Vargas
 1825: Longwaist
 1826: Trinculo
 1827: The Alderman
 1828: Lamplighter
 1829: Zinganee
 1830: Seraph
 1831: Priam
 1832: Chapman
 1833: Camarine
 1834: Colwick
 1835: Plenipotentiary
 1836: Redshank
 1837: Flock
 1838: Redshank
 1839: Quo Minus
 1840: Scroggins
 1841: Epirus
 1842: The Currier
 1843: Ma Mie
 1844: Corranna
 1847: King of Morven
 1850: Retail
 1851: Sotterley
 1852: Lady Agnes
 1853: Ariosto
 1854: Calamus
 1855: Orinoco
 1856: Napoleon III
 1857: Flacrow
 1858: Fisherman
 1859: Sedbury
 1860: Cynricus
 1861: Crater
 1862: Blackcock
 1863: Romanoff
 1864: Bathilde
 1865: Pirate
 1866: Mazeppa
 1867: Lord Lyon
 1868: Lady Coventry
 1869: Blue Gown
 1870: Rosicrucian
 1871: Panoplite
 1872: Sterling
 1873: Prince Charlie
 1874: Drummond
 1875: Gang Forward
 1876–77: no race

Current version

 1878: Thurio
 1879: Discord
 1880: Fernandez
 1881: Cameliard
 1882: Laureate
 1883: Grandmaster
 1884: Scot Free
 1885: Esterling
 1886: Grey Friars
 1887: The Baron
 1888: Orbit
 1889: Gay Hampton
 1890: Morion
 1891: Friar Lubin
 1892: The Lover
 1893: Harbinger
 1894: Sempronius
 1895: The Owl
 1896: Lord Hervey
 1897: Guernsey
 1898: Jeddah
 1899: Solennis
 1900: Headpiece
 1901: Rigo
 1902: Port Blair
 1903: Countermark
 1904: Airlie
 1905: St Oswald
 1906: His Eminence
 1907: Slieve Gallion
 1908: no race
 1909: Howick
 1910: Neil Gow
 1911: Irish King
 1912: Jingling Geordie
 1913: Sanquhar
 1914: Kennymore
 1915: Rossendale
 1916: Sir Dighton / Roi d'Ecosse *
 1917: Dansellon
 1918: Benevente
 1919: Buchan
 1920: Daylight Patrol
 1921: no race
 1922: Collaborator
 1923: Light Hand
 1924: St Germans
 1925: Picaroon
 1926: Harpagon
 1927: Tattoo
 1928: Royal Minstrel
 1929: Cragadour
 1930: Writ
 1931: Philae
 1932: Loaningdale
 1933: Lochiel
 1934: Colombo
 1935: Buckleigh
 1936: Monument
 1937: Snowfall
 1938: Challenge
 1939: Signal Light
 1940: Prince Tetra
 1941: Morogoro
 1942–45: no race
 1946: Gulf Stream
 1947: Migoli
 1948: My Babu
 1949: Moondust
 1950: Rising Flame
 1951: Claudius
 1952: Kara Tepe
 1953: Oleandrin
 1954: Ambler II
 1955: True Cavalier
 1956: Pirate King
 1957: Shearwater
 1958: Bald Eagle
 1959: Pindari
 1960: Tudorich
 1961: Aurelius
 1962: High Noon
 1963: Crocket
 1964: Young Christopher
 1965: Corifi
 1966: Salvo
 1967: Sloop
 1968: Petingo
 1969: Paddy's Progress

* The 1916 race was a dead-heat and has joint winners.

See also
 Horse racing in Great Britain
 List of British flat horse races

References

 Paris-Turf:
 Racing Post:

 galopp-sieger.de – Craven Stakes.
 ifhaonline.org – International Federation of Horseracing Authorities – Craven Stakes (2019).
 pedigreequery.com – Craven Stakes – Newmarket.
 
 
 

Flat horse races for three-year-olds
Newmarket Racecourse
Flat races in Great Britain
1771 establishments in England
Recurring sporting events established in 1771